Westlake Center is a four-story shopping center and 25-story office tower in downtown Seattle, Washington, United States. The southern terminus of the Seattle Center Monorail, it is located across Pine Street from Westlake Park, between 4th and 5th Avenues. It is named for Westlake Avenue, which now terminates north of the mall but once ran two blocks farther south to Pike Street. Westlake Park is considered Seattle's "town square" and celebrities and political figures often make appearances or give speeches from the building's balcony.

The current shopping center began construction in 1986 after over 20 years of planning, and opened its doors on October 20, 1988. The mall has two food courts: the Asean StrEAT Food Hall on the first floor, which opened in November 2022 and was designed to resemble Southeast Asian food hawker stands; and Bites on Pine Food Hall on the second floor. The monorail terminal is located on the third floor.

Surrounding area

Surrounding the mall and park, Seattle's main shopping district draws scores of both locals and visitors (the Washington State Convention and Trade Center is located in this district). To the west of Westlake Center is the (now-closed) main store for Macy's Northwest (previously the flagship store and corporate headquarters for The Bon Marché). To the east is the flagship Nordstrom store and corporate headquarters (previously the flagship store of Frederick & Nelson). In the surrounding area are locations for various major retailers and restaurant chains.

Seattle's version of the Macy's Thanksgiving Day Parade is located in this area. Also, many stores were vandalized during the WTO Ministerial Conference of 1999, during which massive protests occurred in downtown Seattle. It was also the site of the Occupy Seattle protest, which was a solidarity demonstration for Occupy Wall Street.

Public transportation

Westlake Center is a public transportation hub for Seattle, serving as a terminus for the Seattle Center Monorail and the South Lake Union Streetcar. Underneath the mall is the Downtown Seattle Transit Tunnel which houses several stops on Sound Transit's Link light rail line.

Plaza

Westlake Center Plaza is located on the corner of 4th Avenue and Pine St and has a small, one-story (plus loft) retail pavilion. The plaza is covered in gray pavers and features several small trees. The retail space totals  and is leased to Starbucks (it was previously leased to Seattle's Best Coffee).

See also
List of upscale shopping districts

References

External links

 Westlake Center

Shopping malls in Seattle
Shopping malls established in 1988
1988 establishments in Washington (state)
Downtown Seattle
Brookfield Properties